Zhuxi may refer to:

People
 Zhu Xi (1130–1200), Chinese philosopher 
 Wang Zhuxi (1911–1983), Chinese physicist, educator and philologist
 Zhao Zhu Xi (1900–1991), Chinese martial arts grand master

Places
 Zhuxi County, Shiyan, Hubei, China
 Zhuxi, Xianju County, town in Xianju County, Zhejiang, China

Titles
 President of China (PRC), although "Zhuxi" does not mean "President" for equivalent titles elsewhere
 Chairman of the Communist Party, its literal and original meaning
 Chairman of the Central Military Commission